Jina Osothsilp is a Thai film studio executive. She serves as CEO of GDH 559, one of Thailand's largest film studios, as well as its predecessor GMM Tai Hub (GTH). Jina graduated from the Faculty of Communication Arts at Chulalongkorn University, and began working in the advertising industry. She joined Jira Maligool's production company Hub Ho Hin Bangkok in 1991, and helped found GTH, a joint venture between Hub Ho Hin, GMM Pictures and Tai Entertainment, in 2003.

References

Jina Osothsilp
Jina Osothsilp
Jina Osothsilp
Jina Osothsilp
Jina Osothsilp
Living people
Year of birth missing (living people)